The  is the major Scouting organization of Japan. Starting with boys only, the organization was known as Boy Scouts of Japan from 1922 to 1971, and as Boy Scouts of Nippon from 1971 to 1995, when it became coeducational in all sections, leading to neutral naming. Scouting activity decreased radically during World War II but slowly recovered; membership at the end of May 2017 was 99,779.

History

Early years
 
Scouting was introduced to Japan in the autumn of 1909 by ambassador Akizuki Satsuo and Japanese teacher Hōjō Tokiyuki, who had visited England in 1908. A Japanese text based on Scouting for Boys was published as early as 1910, and a few sporadic troops sprang up, without any cohesion and without a proper grasp of the principles and aims of Scouting.

In 1911, General Maresuke Nogi went to England in attendance on Prince Yorihito Higashifushimi for the coronation of King George V. The general, also known as the "Defender of Port Arthur" was introduced to General Robert Baden-Powell, the "Defender of Mafeking".

The Scout troop in Yokohama welcomed Baden-Powell during his visit on 2 April 1912. The troop consisted primarily of British boys, but, from the beginning, also included a small number of American, Danish, and Norwegian boys and was led by a British Scouter, merchant Clarence Griffin. The 1st Yokohama, as it was called, had its first meeting on October 16, 1911 and was registered as a British Troop Abroad. The Troop charter and a Scoutmaster Warrant for Clarence Griffin were issued by Baden-Powell. With this registration only those with British nationality were able to "officially" join the troop, although this rule seems to have been loosely enforced. The Scout Association of Japan recognizes Clarence Griffin as Japan's first Scoutmaster and the "1st Yokohama", now the International Boy Scouts, Troop 1, as Japan's first recognized Boy Scout troop with a marker placed on his grave in the Yokohama Foreign General Cemetery. In 1918, at the urging of missionary Bro. Joseph Janning, the Group registration was changed to "international" and boys of all nationalities were officially allowed to join the troop. In 1923 this Group became the first directly registered Group of the newly formed Boy Scout International Bureau (now World Scout Bureau).
The Troop remains active in Yokohama as the International Boy Scouts, Troop 1.

During his short 1912 visit to Japan Baden-Powell did, however, see something of the Kenjinsha, an old time youth movement. During this period homegrown Japanese troops began to develop and existed alongside expatriate troops in Yokohama, Kobe and Osaka. Hiroshi Koshiba started a Tokyo-based group in 1913. At the time of the coronation of the Taishō Emperor in 1915, Scouts were organized in Tokyo, Shizuoka, Kyoto and Hokkaido.

In 1920 three delegates, Toyomatsu Shimoda, Hiroshi Koshiba, and Richard Suzuki, attended the 1st World Scout Jamboree at Olympia, London. Shimoda and Koshiba were both adults and, when they met Richard Suzuki aboard ship and learned he was a Scout, they invited him to join. Richard was the son of a Japanese father and a British mother and was traveling to England for study. Richard was a member of the Yokohama international troop and, being the only Scout aged delegate, Richard carried the Japanese placard in the "Procession of the Nations" during the opening ceremonies.

In 1920 Crown Prince, later Emperor, Hirohito also visited Great Britain, experienced Scouting first hand and expressed the hope that Scouting would develop fully in Japan and join the world movement. The Nippon Kenjidan, forerunner of the "Boy Scouts of Japan" was founded in 1921, when Shimoda began a national group that was restructured and merged with other groups in April 1922. The organization was reformed as the Boy Scouts of Japan in April 1922 by Count Futara Yoshinori and Viscount Mishima Michiharu. Japan was admitted as a member of the World Organization of the Scout Movement later in 1922.

The 1923 Great Kantō earthquake brought the work of the Scouts of Tokyo and Kobe to the notice of the general public. Count Gotō Shimpei, a doctor and a statesman, was made the first Chief Scout of Japan and tasked with the rebuilding. As Minister of Railways, Count Gotō travelled around the country, and was able to promote Scouting in his spare time. In 1924, Japan fielded a full contingent of 25 to the 2nd World Scout Jamboree in Denmark under Rear Admiral Count Sano Tsuneha, during which Count Sano attended a Wood Badge course at Gilwell Park. Count Sano returned to Japan and created Japan's own training course, called Jisshu-jo, for both Cub and Scout leaders, which is still used to this day, after completion of two preliminary courses, Koshu-kai and Kenshu-kai.

Count Futara Yoshinori was the first Japanese member of the World Scout Committee of the World Organization of the Scout Movement from 1931 until 1939.

In February 1937, Isamu Takeshita was appointed head of the Boy Scouts of Japan, the Sea Scouts, and the YMCA, as part of the general militarization of Japanese sports and athletics taking place at that time.

Japanese military authorities did not consistently encourage the Scouting movement in occupied territories. Where local conditions were favorable, authorities would permit local Scouting or introduce Japanese-style Scouting, or Shōnendan, and sometimes even made this compulsory. On the other hand, where conditions were not favorable, and anti-Japanese sentiments were likely to be nurtured through Scouting, the authorities would prohibit it entirely.

World War II and aftermath
Scouting in Japan suffered almost complete eclipse in World War II, and took time to recover. Occupation authorities had blacklisted the ex-military officers, disregarding age or sympathies. This held Count Sano and others back from their sincere desire to restore Boy Scouts of Japan to its former correct basis. Gradually, military supervision was relaxed and the original group began to take over, with beneficial results.

The occupation period was difficult on Scouting, just as it was on Japanese daily life. The participant patch (usually embroidered or woven) for the first National Scout Rally was printed on paper, because of the financial situation of that time. Period pieces of Scouting memorabilia from that time are rare and highly prized. Japan was re-admitted as a full member of the World Organization of the Scout Movement in 1950, remarkable and unique in the history of nations in which Scouting has been interrupted. Within ten years of World War II, Scout membership had grown to 80,000. In 1957, the first Wood Badge course by that name was held in Japan. In 1959, Japan held the Second Nippon Jamboree, shortly after the conclusion of the 10th World Scout Jamboree in the Philippines.

Modern period
In 1961, Viscount Michiharu Mishima was awarded the Bronze Wolf, awarded by the World Scout Committee for exceptional services to world Scouting. Other recipients from Japan include Hidesaburō Kurushima, chairman of the national board and international commissioner, in 1967, Taizō Ishizaka in 1971, Saburō Matsukata in 1972, Shintarō Negishi in 1975, Akira Watanabe in 1977, Yorihiro Matsudaira in 1981, August S. Narumi in 1984, Ichirō Terao in 1985, and Yoritake Matsudaira in 2012.

In 1971, BSJ hosted three major World Scouting events, the 13th World Scout Jamboree and the 1st World Scout Forum in Shizuoka, and the 23rd World Scout Conference in Tokyo.

After the 13th World Scout Jamboree in 1971, there was discussion about the national association's name. The word "Japan" is not Japanese, rather based on a southern Chinese dialect, which Marco Polo heard as "Zippang", eventually becoming "Japan" in English. The Japanese corrected the association's name to match their own language, as "Boy Scouts of Nippon" in 1971.

Since 1974, SAJ has every year invited some 45 Scouts from Scout associations in the Asia-Pacific Region to take part in major international events such as Jamborees, Ventures, Agoonorees and Rover Scouting events.

In 1995, Japanese Scouting became coeducational and, after that point, to use "Boy Scout" would strictly be incorrect. Further it was decided that the proper national name "Nippon" was not well known worldwide. Japanese Scouting once again changed its national association's name in English to the "Scout Association of Japan" (SAJ). However, there is contradiction in the original charter, that Boy Scouts of Japan (or Nippon) is still used in the writing of the Japanese language Scout Constitution. Therefore, it was decided that the official name is to be in the Japanese language, and the English expression is for the convenience and benefit of overseas Scouts to connect with Japanese Scouting.

SAJ celebrated its 75th Anniversary of founding of the National Scout Association in 1997 and hosted the second Asia-Pacific Regional Top Leaders' Summit Conference in Gotemba and Tokyo.

Scouting in Japan has grown steadily and established an eminent place for itself in social education for young people. The aim of the Scout Association of Japan is to help young people become responsible humanitarian citizens, who can appreciate and practice loyalty, courage and self-respect in an international perspective. With the support of volunteer leaders, the Scout movement in Japan provides fun-filled, challenging programs, with an emphasis on developing each young person's character, health, abilities and sense of service to others.

The Scout Association of Japan is a non-political, voluntary movement, with open subscription. The geographic structure of Japanese Scouting is the council, generally conforming to prefecture boundaries. Japanese Scouting also exists abroad, in communities with large native Japanese populations, such as Amsterdam (Netherlands) and Singapore.

In recent years, SAJ held several international events, which include the sixth Nippon Agoonoree in Ehime in August 1999, the 5th Nippon Venture in Ōita in August 2000, the National Rover Moot 2001 in Aichi in August 2001, and the 23rd Asia-Pacific/13th Nippon Jamboree in Osaka in August 2002.

Japanese Scouts are actively involved in international understanding and cooperation programs, such as the ORT twinning project by Rovers with the Bangladesh Scouts, and nationwide fundraising activities for refugees in UNHCR camps.

The 23rd World Scout Jamboree took place at Kirara Beach, Yamaguchi, in 2015. The theme was "和 Wa: A Spirit of Unity".

Chief Scouts
 1st Shimoda Toyomatsu, 1924–1929
 2nd Gotō Shinpei, 1935–1936
 3rd Isamu Takeshita, 1937–1945
 4th Mishima Michiharu, 1951–1965
 5th Hidesaburō Kurushima, 1966–1970
 6th Saburō Matsukata, 1971–1973
 7th Akira Watanabe, 1974–2003
 8th Shōichi Saba, 2003 – April 1, 2006
 9th Tsunao Hashimoto, April 1, 2006 – March 31, 2010
 10th Takayasu Okushima, April 1, 2010 – present

Scouting program and ideals

The Scout emblem incorporates the sacred mirror Yata no Kagami, which represents wisdom and honesty.

The Japanese Scout uniform consists of a brown vest, brown pants with light blue pockets, and light blue cap for Beaver Scouts; a blue shirt, pants, and cap for Cub Scouts; khaki with green line edge shirt and pants, and a green beret for Boy Scouts; and a khaki shirt and pants, and green beret for Venture, Rover, and adult Scouts. Prior to the 23rd World Scout Jamboree, the SAJ introduced new uniforms and phased in new insignia for all sections. Standardized council insignia were introduced for the first time in 2015.  The new council badges are 4.8 cm x 11 cm, smaller than the standard US version.

The program sections are:
 Beaver Scouts, age 6 to 8
 Cub Scouts, age 8 to 11
 Boy Scouts, age 11 to 14
 Venture Scouts, age 14 to 20
 Rover Scouts, age 18 to 24

Scout Promise and Oath
In the Scout Association of Japan, Beaver Scouts and Cub Scouts use the term "Promise". Scouts above are use the term "Oath". However, in the official English website of the Scout Association of Japan, these are all called "Promise".

Scout Law

Ranks
The ranks are:
 Tenderfoot (Sho-kyū )
 2nd Class (Ni-kyū )
 1st Class (Ikkyū )
 Chrysanthemum (Kiku )

"Kiku" is the Japanese word for chrysanthemum.

It is named after Mount Fuji.

Councils
The SAJ operates and maintains 48 councils, each corresponding to prefectural borders and a National Council for top-level staff and employees.

Decline in membership 
Per SAJ records, membership dropped from 332,000 in 1983 to 115,000 in 2016.

Total membership at the end of March 2012 was 143,272.

By the end of March 2015, membership was 105,676

SAJ statistical data as of May, 2017 is 99,779, a loss of 9,749 from 2016, the first time to drop below 100,000 since the 1960s.

Awards for Japanese Scouters
  The highest award, suspended from a white ribbon with two red stripes
  The second-highest award, suspended from a white ribbon with two green stripes
  The third-highest award, suspended from a white ribbon with two yellow stripes

Notable Scouts
 Ryutaro Hashimoto, the 82nd and 83rd Prime Minister of Japan
 Yukio Hattori, the fifth president of the Hattori Nutrition College, commentator on the Japanese cooking competition program Iron Chef
 Soichi Noguchi, Japanese astronaut
 Makoto Raiku, manga artist (Zatch Bell!)
 Shigeru Miyamoto, Japanese video game designer

International Scouting
The Scout Association of Japan hosted the 13th World Scout Jamboree on the Asagiri Plateau, Shizuoka Prefecture, in 1971, and the nearly simultaneous 23rd World Scout Conference. Since then, it has hosted numerous other international activities, including the Asia Pacific Top Leaders Summit in 1997, the Asia-Pacific Multi-Purpose Workshop in 2000, and the 23rd Asia-Pacific/13th Nippon Jamboree in 2002.
Japan also hosted the 23rd World Scout Jamboree in 2015 in Yamaguchi.

An exchange program between the Scout Association of Japan and the Boy Scouts of America was started in 1998, at the suggestion of then-Prime Minister Ryutaro Hashimoto in a 1996 meeting with U.S. President Bill Clinton.

See also
 Kurushima Takehiko
 Koshiba Hiroshi
 Hōjō Tokiyuki
 Isamu Takeshita
 Girl Scouts of Japan
 Baden-Powell Scouts Association-Japan
 World Buddhist Scout Brotherhood
 Boy Scouts of Manchukuo

Notes

References

Further reading

External links
 Official website of Scout Association of Japan 
 Official website of Scout Association of Japan 

Scouting in Japan
World Organization of the Scout Movement member organizations
Youth organizations established in 1913
1913 establishments in Japan